Drasteria catocalis is a moth of the family Erebidae. It is found in Kyrghyzstan, Kazakhstan, Tadjikistan, China, Uzbekistan and Russia (Siberia, Altai).

References

Drasteria
Moths described in 1882
Moths of Asia